Vicente Eduardo Mosquera Mena (born December 9, 1979 in Panama City, Panama) is a Panamanian professional boxer. He is a former World Boxing Association (WBA) super-featherweight champion.

On April 30, 2005 he defeated Yodsanan Sor Nanthachai (Yodsanan 3-K Battery) for the WBA world championship title, by a unanimous decision. The official scorers saw it 118-108, 116-111, 115-112. In the fight, Nanthachai was knocked down three times (in  the first, third, and eleventh rounds). Mosquera also was knocked down in the third round.

On August 5, 2006, Mosquera lost his belt to Edwin Valero by TKO in the 10th round.  Several days after the Valero fight, Mosquera was involved in an unclear altercation that resulted in the death of a person. He remained incarcerated for three and a half years before being found innocent in trial.

External links 
 

1979 births
Living people
Sportspeople from Panama City
Super-featherweight boxers
World boxing champions
Panamanian male boxers